Christopher Mogere Obure (born 1943) is a Kenyan politician. He belongs to the Jubilee Party and was elected to represent the Bobasi Constituency in the National Assembly of Kenya in the December 2007 parliamentary election. He was born in Boigesa Village on September 29, 1943, in the then larger Bobasi Machoge Constituency which has since been split into Bobasi and Bomachoge Constituencies. He worked for Bata Shoe Company and Kenya Breweries Limited (now East Africa Breweries) before joining politics. He was the Minister of Public Works in the Government of National Unity.  He was the first Senator of Kisii County.

References

Living people
1950 births
Members of the Senate of Kenya
Orange Democratic Movement politicians
Kenya African National Union politicians
Members of the National Assembly (Kenya)
Ministers of Finance of Kenya
Ministers of Agriculture of Kenya
People from Nyanza Province
University of Nairobi alumni